The Men's Individual Pursuit B track cycling event at the 2016 Summer Paralympics took place on September 8. This class is for blind and visually impaired cyclists riding with a sighted pilot. Sixteen pairs from 11 different nations compete.

The competition will begin with eight head to head races between the 16 riders. These races were held over a 4000m course and each rider is given a time for their race. The fastest two riders are advanced to the gold medal final whilst the third and fourth fastest times race it out for the bronze. The medal finals are held on the same day as the heats.

Records

Preliminaries
Q = Qualifier for gold final
Qb = Qualifier for bronze final
PR = Paralympic Record
WR = World Record

Finals 
Gold medal match

Bronze medal match

References

Men's pursuit B